Chinchpokli (formerly Chinchpugli, station code: CHG) is a railway station on the Central Line of the Mumbai Suburban Railway.

The Chinchpokli Railway station opened in 1877.

In 1896, during the Bombay plague epidemic, the Chinchpokli Station was converted into medical transit place.

Notes and references

Railway stations in India opened in 1877
Mumbai CST-Kalyan rail line
Railway stations in Mumbai City district
Mumbai Suburban Railway stations